Mouzaki is a town and a municipality in the northwestern part of the Karditsa regional unit, Greece. Mouzaki is located on the southwestern edge of the Thessalian plain, where the river Pamisos descends from the Agrafa mountains. It is 17 km southwest of Trikala and 24 km northwest of Karditsa. The Greek National Road 30 (Arta - Trikala - Karditsa - Volos) passes north of the town.
In 2020, Mouzaki was heavily effected by the medicane known as Cyclone Ianos. The town was flooded for several days.

Municipality
The municipality Mouzaki was formed at the 2011 local government reform by the merger of the following 3 former municipalities, that became municipal units:
Ithomi
Mouzaki
Pamisos

The municipality has an area of 313.866 km2, the municipal unit 179.521 km2.

Subdivisions
The municipal unit of Mouzaki is divided into the following communities (constituent settlements in brackets):
Amygdali
Anthochori (Anthochori, Anoixiatiko, Platanakos)
Drakotrypa (Drakotrypa, Arpakia, Keramargio, Milies, Spathes, Trygona, Tsarouchi)
Ellinokastro (Ellinokastro, Gravia, Petrota)
Gelanthi
Kryopigi (Kryopigi, Lakkes, Xirokampos)
Lazarina
Magoulitsa
Mavrommati (Mavrommati, Georgios Karaiskakis)
Mouzaki
Oxya (Oxya, Vagenia, Dafni, Zamanatiko, Koura, Megali Vrysi, Mesorrachi, Palaiampela, Palaiochori, Platania, Soula, Sykia)
Pefkofyto (Pefkofyto, Nisia, Padi, Charavgi)
Porti (Porti, Martini, Meligos, Palaiokastro)
Vatsounia

Population

External links
 Mouzaki (town) on GTP Travel Pages
 Mouzaki (municipality) on GTP Travel Pages

References

Municipalities of Thessaly
Populated places in Karditsa (regional unit)